Calendula is a genus of about 15–20 species of annual and perennial herbaceous plants in the daisy family Asteraceae that are often known as marigolds. They are native to southwestern Asia, western Europe, Macaronesia, and the Mediterranean. Other plants also known as marigolds, including corn marigold, desert marigold, marsh marigold, and plants of the genus Tagetes.

The genus name Calendula is a modern Latin diminutive of calendae, meaning "little calendar", "little clock" or possibly "little weather-glass". The common name "marigold" refers to the Virgin Mary. The most commonly cultivated and used member of the genus is Calendula officinalis, the pot marigold. Popular herbal and cosmetic products named "Calendula" invariably derive from C.officinalis.

Uses

History
Calendula was not a major medicinal herb but it was used in historic times for headaches, red eye, fever and toothaches. As late as the 17th century Nicholas Culpeper claimed Calendula benefited the heart, but it was not considered an especially efficacious medicine.

In historic times Calendula was more often used for magical purposes than medicinal ones. One 16th-century potion containing Calendula claimed to reveal fairies. An unmarried woman with two suitors would take a blend of powdered Calendula, marjoram, wormwood and thyme simmered in honey and white wine used as an ointment in a ritual to reveal her true match.

Ancient Romans and Greeks used the golden Calendula in many rituals and ceremonies, sometimes wearing crowns or garlands made from the flowers. One of its nicknames is "Mary's Gold", referring to the flowers' use in early Christian events in some countries. Calendula flowers are sacred flowers in India and have been used to decorate the statues of Hindu deities since early times.

However, the most common use in historic times was culinary, and the plant was used for both its color and its flavor. They were used for dumplings, wine, oatmeal and puddings. In English cuisine Calendula were often cooked in the same pot with spinach, or used to flavor stewed birds. According to sixteenth-century Englishman John Gerard, every proper soup of Dutch cuisine in his era would include Calendula petals.

Culinary
Also known as "poor man's saffron," the petals are edible and can be used fresh in salads or dried and used to color cheese or as a substitute for saffron. Calendulas have a mildly sweet taste that is slightly bitter, and as it dries these flavors become more intense.  It can be used to add color to soups, stews, poultry dishes, custards and liquors.

The common name for Calendula officinalis in Britain is 'pot-marigold,' named so because of its use in broths and soups.

Dyes
Dye can be extracted from the flower and produce shades of honey, gold oranges, light browns, and vibrant yellows.

Chemistry
The flowers of C. officinalis contain flavonol glycosides, triterpene oligoglycosides, oleanane-type triterpene glycosides, saponins, and a sesquiterpene glucoside.

Pharmacological effects
Calendula officinalis oil is still used medicinally as an anti-inflammatory and a remedy for healing wounds. Calendula ointments are skin products available for use on minor cuts, burns, and skin irritation; however, evidence of their effectiveness is weak.

Plant pharmacological studies have suggested that Calendula extracts have antiviral, antigenotoxic, and anti-inflammatory properties in vitro. In herbalism, Calendula in suspension or in tincture is used topically for treating acne, reducing inflammation, controlling bleeding, and soothing irritated tissue.
Limited evidence indicates Calendula cream or ointment is effective in treating radiation dermatitis. Topical application of C. officinalis ointment has helped to prevent dermatitis and pain; thus reducing the incidence rate of skipped radiation treatments in randomized trials.

Calendula has been used traditionally for abdominal cramps and constipation. In experiments with rabbit jejunum, the aqueous-ethanol extract of C. officinalis flowers was shown to have both spasmolytic and spasmogenic effects, thus providing a scientific rationale for this traditional use. An aqueous extract of C. officinalis obtained by a novel extraction method has demonstrated antitumor (cytotoxic) activity and immunomodulatory properties (lymphocyte activation) in vitro, as well as antitumor activity in mice.

Calendula plants are known to cause allergic reactions, and should be avoided during pregnancy.

Diversity

Species include:
Calendula arvensis (Vaill.) L. – field marigold, wild marigold
Calendula denticulata Schousb. ex Willd.
Calendula eckerleinii Ohle
Calendula incana Willd.
Calendula incana subsp. algarbiensis (Boiss.) Ohle
Calendula incana subsp. maderensis (DC.) Ohle – Madeiran marigold
Calendula incana subsp. maritima (Guss.) Ohle – sea marigold
Calendula incana subsp. microphylla (Lange) Ohle
Calendula lanzae Maire
Calendula maritima Guss. - sea marigold
Calendula maroccana (Ball) Ball
Calendula maroccana subsp. maroccana
Calendula maroccana subsp. murbeckii (Lanza) Ohle
Calendula meuselii Ohle
Calendula officinalis L. – pot marigold, garden marigold, ruddles, Scottish marigold
Calendula palaestina Boiss.
Calendula stellata Cav.
Calendula suffruticosa Vahl
Calendula suffruticosa subsp. balansae (Boiss. & Reut.) Ohle
Calendula suffruticosa subsp. boissieri Lanza 
Calendula suffruticosa subsp. fulgida (Raf.) Guadagno 
Calendula suffruticosa subsp. lusitanica (Boiss.) Ohle
Calendula suffruticosa subsp. maritima (Guss.) Meikle
Calendula suffruticosa subsp. monardii (Boiss. & Reut.) Ohle
Calendula suffruticosa subsp. tomentosa Murb.
Calendula tripterocarpa Rupr.

Gallery

References

External links
Flora Europaea: Calendula
Germplasm Resources Information Network: Calendula
Botanical.com: Calendula

 
Asteraceae genera
Garden plants
Medicinal plants